Trechus cumberlandus is a species of ground beetle in the subfamily Trechinae. It was described by Barr in 1962.

Trechus cumberlandus has a length ranging from 3.4 mm to 3.8 mm and has a brownish black colouration.
Their elytra have only faint ridges.

Their common habitat is caves with high humidity.

References

cumberlandus
Beetles described in 1962